Glen Innes Severn is a local government area in the New England region of New South Wales, Australia. The council was formed by the amalgamation of Severn Shire and Glen Innes City Council.

The Mayor of Glen Innes Severn Council is Cr. Robert Banham.

Main towns and villages
The council area includes the town of Glen Innes and villages including Emmaville, Deepwater, Wellingrove, Glencoe, Stonehenge and Red Range and several hamlets including Diehard, Gibraltar Range, Kingsgate and Wellington Vale.

Heritage listings
The Glenn Innes Servern has a number of heritage-listed sites, including:
 High Conservation Value Old Growth forest

Demographics
Aboriginal and Torres Strait Islander people made up 5.6 per cent of the population which is approximately double both the national and state averages. The median age of people in the Glen Innes Severn Council area was 46 years; nearly ten years higher than the national median. Children aged 0 – 14 years made up 18.1 per cent of the population and people aged 65 years and over made up 22.0 per cent of the population. Of people in the area aged 15 years and over, 48.7 per cent were married and 14.1 per cent were either divorced or separated.

When compared with total population growth of Australia for the same periods, being 5.78 per cent and 8.32 per cent for each fiveyear period respectively, population growth in the Glen Innes Severn local government area was significantly lower than the national average. The median weekly income for residents within the Glen Innes Severn Council area was below the national average.

At the 2011 census, the proportion of residents in the Glen Innes Severn local government area who stated their ancestry as Australian or Anglo-Saxon exceeded 92 per cent of all residents (national average was 65.2 per cent). In excess of 69 per cent of all residents in the Glen Innes Severn Council area nominated a religious affiliation with Christianity at the 2011 census, which was significantly higher than the national average of 50.2 per cent. Meanwhile, as at the census date, compared to the national average, households in the Glen Innes Severn local government area had a significantly lower than average proportion (2.7 per cent) where two or more languages are spoken (national average was 20.4 per cent); and a significantly higher proportion (93 per cent) where English only was spoken at home (national average was 76.8 per cent).

Council

Current composition and election method
Glen Innes Severn Council is composed of seven councillors elected proportionally as a single ward. All councillors are elected for a fixed four-year term of office. The mayor is elected by the councillors at the first meeting of the council. The most recent election was held in December 2021, and the makeup of the council is as follows:

The current Council, elected in 2021, in order of election, is:

References 

 
Local government areas of New South Wales
New England (New South Wales)
2004 establishments in Australia